This is a list of British representatives in the Trucial States from 1939 to 1971. They were responsible for representing British interests in the Trucial States, a British protectorate consisting of seven emirates in the Persian Gulf, which formed the United Arab Emirates (UAE) after the protectorate ended.

For British representatives in the UAE since 1971, see: List of ambassadors of the United Kingdom to the United Arab Emirates.

List

(Dates in italics indicate de facto continuation of office)

See also

Persian Gulf Residency
History of the United Arab Emirates
Foreign relations of the United Arab Emirates

External links

British representatives
History of the United Arab Emirates
Trucial States
United Arab Emirates–United Kingdom relations